Alfons Gabriel (1894–1976) was an Austrian geographer, explorer and travel writer who made several trips to the deserts of Iran, during 1927–8, 1933, and 1937.

Gabriel wrote five books about his trips and findings.  His book  (1935) is translated into Persian.

Bibliography
, Munich and Berlin, 1929. 
, Stuttgart, 1935. 
, Stuttgart, 1939. 
, wildes Iran. Drei Jahre Forschungsfahrten in Wüsten und Steppen. 3d edition, Stuttgart, 1942. 
Fremde Meere, Dschungeln und Wüsten. Vienna, Universum, 1948 
, Vienna, 1952

References

1892 births
1976 deaths
Austrian explorers
Austrian geographers
Austrian travel writers
Explorers of Asia
20th-century geographers